Brandon Beane (born July 27, 1976) is an American football executive who is the general manager for the Buffalo Bills of the National Football League (NFL), a position he has held since 2017. Prior to joining the Bills, Beane served in the personnel department of the Carolina Panthers organization from 1998 to 2016.

Career
Before joining the Bills, Beane held various roles of increasing responsibility with the Carolina Panthers. He turned down a journalism job for a low-paying internship with the Panthers and eventually rose to become the team's assistant general manager. Beane has worked alongside general managers Marty Hurney and Dave Gettleman, and with head coaches Dom Capers, George Seifert, John Fox, and Ron Rivera.

During his 18-year tenure, Beane's Panthers appeared in Super Bowls XXXVIII and 50, but lost to the New England Patriots and Denver Broncos respectively.

Buffalo Bills
On May 9, 2017, Beane was hired by Buffalo as the general manager, joining former Panthers defensive coordinator Sean McDermott, who had been hired as head coach. After the Bills fired previous general manager Doug Whaley, they opted to hire someone familiar to McDermott due to conflicts within the previous head coach-GM tandems under Whaley.

Within the first season, Beane traded away many of the players Whaley had signed, drafted, or extended, including receiver Sammy Watkins, cornerback Ronald Darby, linebacker Reggie Ragland, and defensive tackle Marcell Dareus. Though Beane arguably had his sights on a long-term rebuild while purging unfavorable contracts for the Bills, some sports commentators criticized his tactics. In 2017, Beane's first season with the team, the Bills ended their 17-year playoff drought. Beane has since drafted players such as quarterback Josh Allen, linebacker Tremaine Edmunds, and defensive tackle Ed Oliver and brought in numerous offensive free agents with the team's new cap space. On December 10, 2020, Beane signed a contract extension through 2025.

Personal life
Beane was a high school quarterback before injuries cut short his athletic career. He graduated from UNC Wilmington with a degree in communications, and he has two sons, Tyson and Wes, with his wife Hayley.

References

Living people
Buffalo Bills executives
National Football League general managers
Carolina Panthers executives
People from Stanly County, North Carolina
1976 births